Etim Esin John  (born 5 October 1966) is a retired Nigerian international footballer. He is one of the most gifted players in Nigeria’s football history.

Esin played for Iwuanyanwu Nationale, Flash Flamingoes, and Calabar Rovers before moving to Belgium.

He was nicknamed "Maradona", by legendary Nigerian radio commentator Ernest Okonkwo.

International career
He has represented his country at the 1987 FIFA World Youth Championship and in 6 FIFA World Cup qualification matches.
He was left out of the team that represented Nigeria at the 1994 world cup due to the fact that there was a report that he was banned by FIFA for allegedly raping a minor during his playing days with Lierse fc, a claim that was later proven to be false 25 years later.

References

External links
 Profile - Lierse SK
 Profile & stats - Lokeren

1969 births
Living people
Sportspeople from Akwa Ibom State
Nigerian footballers
Nigeria international footballers
Nigeria under-20 international footballers
Association football forwards
Belgian Pro League players
Dolphin F.C. (Nigeria) players
K.A.A. Gent players
K.S.C. Lokeren Oost-Vlaanderen players
Lierse S.K. players
Kayserispor footballers
Nigerian expatriate footballers
Expatriate footballers in Belgium
Expatriate footballers in Turkey
Bendel United F.C. players